Rat Island may refer to:

Ilha dos Ratos, the original name for Ilha Fiscal in Rio de Janeiro, Brasil
Hawadax Island, Alaska, USA, formerly known as "Rat Island"
Rat Island, New York, USA
Rat Island (Houtman Abrolhos), an island in Western Australia
An alternative name for Burrow Island in Portsmouth Harbour, Hampshire, England
Motukiore, Bay of Islands, New Zealand
Rat Island, Lundy, a small island near the south end of Lundy, Devon, England
Rat Island: a small island west of Bengkulu (19th Century name)
Rat Island, St Lucia

See also
 Rat Islands